Split Mountain is located in the Lewis Range, Glacier National Park in the U.S. state of Montana.

Geology

Like other mountains in Glacier National Park, Split Mountain is composed of sedimentary rock laid down during the Precambrian to Jurassic periods.

Climate
Based on the Köppen climate classification, it is located in an alpine subarctic climate zone with long, cold, snowy winters, and cool to warm summers. Temperatures can drop below −10 °F with wind chill factors below −30 °F.

Gallery

See also
 Mountains and mountain ranges of Glacier National Park (U.S.)

References

Split
Split
Lewis Range
Mountains of Montana
North American 2000 m summits